John Martin (1805 – 7 March 1880) was a British Whig politician.

Brown was first elected Whig MP for Tewkesbury at the 1832 general election but lost the seat at the next general election in 1835. However, he regained the seat in 1837 and held the seat until he stood down in 1859.

Brown's family were well-known in the Tewkesbury. His father, also named John, was also a Whig MP for the seat before him, while his brother James became Liberal MP immediately after he stepped down in 1859.

References

External links
 

Whig (British political party) MPs for English constituencies
UK MPs 1832–1835
UK MPs 1837–1841
UK MPs 1841–1847
UK MPs 1847–1852
UK MPs 1852–1857
UK MPs 1857–1859
1805 births
1880 deaths
Committee members of the Society for the Diffusion of Useful Knowledge